Padi Padi Leche Manasu is a 2018 Indian Telugu-language romantic drama film written and directed by Hanu Raghavapudi. The film stars Sharwanand and Sai Pallavi while Priya Raman, Sampath Raj, Kalyani Natarajan, Murali Sharma, Priyadarshi, and Sunil play supporting roles.

The music was composed by Vishal Chandrasekhar with cinematography done by Jay Kay and editing by A. Sreekar Prasad. The film was finalized in December 2017 and shooting began in February 2018. Released on 21 December 2018, the film opened to mixed reviews at the critics. The film ended up as a commercial failure.

Plot
It is a Telugu-speaking community in Kolkata where a football player named Surya (Sharwanand) falls for a medical student named Vaishali (Sai Pallavi). The love story is not as simple as it appears to be. Surya starts trying to make Vaishali fall for him. After Vaishali falls in love with Surya and starts talking about marriage, Surya breaks up with her due to his fear of commitment as a result of his parents’ failed marriage. Vaishali tells him that exactly after a year, they will meet in Kathmandu, Nepal and decide whether they should get married or not.

Exactly after a year, the Nepal 2015 earthquake occurs, where Surya is searching for Vaishali. Simultaneously, Vaishali is searching for Surya in Kathmandu. In the earthquake Vaishali is injured and she asks her friend to tell Surya that she is diagnosed with retrograde amnesia and still acts as if she is fine, with her friends and family except Surya. So Surya tries to make her fall in love again, in a similar way he tried before. One day his father (who is a famous author) comes nearby to give a speech which is attended by Vaishali, Surya and Surya's mother. During the speech Vaishali realizes her love for Surya and his love for her. She asks him to marry her, where he realises she hasn't lost her memory, infuriating him. In a struggle here, Vaishali faints and is admitted to the hospital where it is revealed that she actually has retrograde amnesia and told only Surya the truth and that she was slowly forgetting the things even in her daily life.

The movie ends with both of them getting married after a few months

Cast

 Sharwanand as Surya
 Sai Pallavi as Vaishali
 Priya Raman as Padmavathi, Surya's mother
 Sampath Raj as Vivek Ravipati, Surya's father
 Kalyani Natarajan as Vaishali's mother
 Murali Sharma as Prakash Cherukuri, Vaishali's father
 Priyadarshi Pullikonda as Darshi
 Sunil as Chatur Ramalingam
 Vennela Kishore as Gemini Natarajan
 Kalpika Ganesh as Vaishali's friend
 Suhas as Suhas, Surya's friend
 Noel Sean as Shravan
 Ajay as Dr. Rakesh
 Mahadevan as Dhanraj Pillai
 Ravi Kale as Nepal Police Officer
 Satyam Rajesh as Eve Teaser
 Kadambari Kiran as Chatur's father
 Shatru as Dhanraj's henchman
 Vinayak Ram Attili as Vaishali's neighbor
 Appaji Ambarisha Darbha as Gokhale
 Raju Sundaram as a goon (special appearance)

Production
The film schedule was to start by the end of March, but since actress Sai Pallavi had dates only in February, the film start scheduled was preponed to February. The first leg has been shot in Kolkata from 5 February 2018. The second leg of the film was shot extensively in Kathmandu. Some sequences of first leg were shot in interiors of West Bengal. Medical college scenes were shot in Mahindra École Centrale, Hyderabad. Pallavi plays a medical student in the film. Sharwanand lost 10 kilograms and sported a stylish hairstyle for the film. Priya Raman, who played Sharwanand's mother, made her comeback role in acting after 19 years. The film's title was unveiled as Padi Padi Leche Manasu in March 2018.

Release 
The film released on 21 December 2018. The film was also dubbed and released in Hindi as Dil Dhadak Dhadak on YouTube on 26 February 2021 by Goldmines Telefilms.

Soundtrack 
The soundtrack is composed by Vishal Chandrasekhar after his second collaboration with director Hanu Raghavapudi after Krishna Gaadi Veera Prema Gaadha.

References

External links
 

2018 romantic drama films
Films shot in Hyderabad, India
2010s Telugu-language films
Indian romantic drama films
Films set in Kolkata
Films set in Nepal
Films scored by Vishal Chandrasekhar
Films shot in Kolkata
Films shot in Nepal
Films shot in Kathmandu
Films shot in West Bengal